Harmanjot Singh (born 13 April 1996), is an Indian professional footballer who plays as a winger as well as a right back for I-League club Rajasthan United. He played an integral role in the qualification of Rajasthan United in the I-League. Harmanjot along some of other Indian footballers were sponsored by IMG Reliance. He have spent integral of his life in Florida, USA.

Career statistics

Club

Honours
Rajasthan United
Baji Rout Cup: 2022

References

Living people
1999 births
People from Gurdaspur
Footballers from Punjab, India
Indian footballers
India youth international footballers
Association football defenders
Rajasthan United FC players